Oreste Benatti (born 11 June 1906) was an Italian footballer who played as a forward, usually as a winger, although he was also capable of playing as a striker. Known in particular for his speed, offensive movement, quick feet, technical ability, dribbling skills, and consistency as a footballer, he spent four seasons in the Italian Serie A, with A.S. Roma and S.S.C. Napoli, scoring 16 goals in 94 games.

Career

Benatti was born in Mirandola. He began his career with Reggiana in 1927 in the Divisione Nazionale, the Italian First Division at the time, before moving to Roma the following season, where he remained for two seasons in total. He made his debut in the Serie A with Roma on 6 October 1929, in a 3–1 defeat to Alessandria. He played for Lecce in Serie B during the 1930–31 season, before moving to Napoli for the next three seasons. He also played for Spezia and Trento before joining Bagnolese in the Italian lower divisions for the final two seasons of his career, retiring from professional football in 1936.

References

External links
Oreste Benatti Profile at EnciclopediadelCalcio.it

1906 births
People from Mirandola
Italian footballers
Footballers from Emilia-Romagna
Association football forwards
Serie A players
A.C. Reggiana 1919 players
A.S. Roma players
U.S. Lecce players
S.S.C. Napoli players
Spezia Calcio players
A.C. Trento 1921 players
Year of death missing
Sportspeople from the Province of Modena